My Own Way is the second studio album by British Contemporary R&B singer Jay Sean, released 12 May 2008 on Jayded Records and 2Point9 Records. Recording sessions took place from 2006 to 2009. Production was handled by Jay Sean and several other recording producers, including Jared Cotter, J remy, and DJ Swivel, including others. The album peaked at number six on the UK Albums Chart. It produced three singles and the deluxe edition had one more single. Upon its release, My Own Way has received mixed reviews from critics.

Background
The album was initially named after the title track "Deal With It," but the song ended up being given to Corbin Bleu. However, Sean's background vocals remain on Bleu's version of the track. The song "Deal With It" earned Sean a BMI Songwriter Award and was later covered by South Korean band Shinee who released it as the 2009 single "Juliette".

The album was renamed My Own Way and was originally slated for a 3 December 2007 release. However, due to a majority of the tracks being leaked it was pushed back numerous times to 31 March 2008 and again to 28 April 2008. Eventually it was released on 12 May 2008.

Speaking in March 2008 to noted UK R&B writer Pete Lewis - Deputy Editor of the award-winning Blues & Soul - Jay explained the thinking behind the album's title: "It's pretty much self-explanatory really. This whole entire project has been like my little baby - in terms of me nurturing it, making it, watching it grow, and having really hands-on creative control. You know, 'I wannt work with THIS person... I want to write a song like THIS... I want this to be the single... I want these video directors'... And everyone around me in my team has been amazing and has just trusted me to call the shots."

The album features production by J remy, Jose E Duran, Robert Larow, Bobby Bass and Alan Sampson. It was recorded in New York and London and mixed by "Supa Engineer Duro" with Jordan "DJ Swivel" Young in New York City. Jared Cotter co-wrote six songs on the album.

Singles
The first single from the album, "Ride It", released on 21 January 2008 and debuted on the UK Singles Chart at #11. It was successful in Eastern Europe, especially in Russia, Turkey and Romania, where it became one of the three best-selling singles of the year. Sean released a Hindi version of the song for the Indian release of My Own Way. In 2019, the song was remixed by Kosovan DJ Regard and became a viral hit on the TikTok app.
"Maybe", the album's second single, released on 21 April 2008 and debuted on the UK Singles Chart at #19. It was also successful in Japan, where it reached #7 on the Japan Hot 100 Singles. A Hindi version sung by Sean was released as part of My Own Way in India. A Mandarin Chinese cover version by Coco Lee has also been released in China.
The album's third single, "Stay", was released on 7 July but failed to enter the UK Top 40. Sean also sung a Hindi version of the song for the Indian release of My Own Way.

Deluxe Edition
"Tonight", was the first single off the re-pack of My Own Way it was released on 26 January 2009.

Reception

Commercial performance
The album was moderately successful in the UK, reaching #6 on the UK Albums Chart and #1 on the UK R&B Chart. A Hindi version of the album was also released in India. Sean's record label stated that the album sold more than 350,000 copies worldwide. It has been certified silver in the United Kingdom.

Critical response

The album received mixed reviews from critics. Paul Clarke of BBC Music noted, "From one angle Ride It – Jay Sean's comeback single from last year – saw the Hounslow-born artist in exactly the same place as he was when he broke through in 2003 with Dance With You: Talking about cruising the clubs and making eyes at the ladies." DesiHits stated that it is "the biggest album to hit the Urban Desi scene of late and just listening to the album stripping away all the hype all the glamour it’s plain to see Jay’s created an album that you can sit back, relax and enjoy."

Angus Batey of The Guardian stated, "My Own Way is a decent record, but erroneously titled...He has lost - not for ever, one hopes - the stuff that made him stand out", in comparison to his experimental debut album Me Against Myself (2004). Sean later responded that the reason he gave up on the Indian-R&B fusion music that he helped popularize is because it had eventually become too common in Asian Underground and Indian pop music.

Track listing

My Own Way: Deluxe Edition
On 21 December 2008 at the Mobo Awards Jay Sean confirmed backstage that the "Deluxe Edition" of 'My Own Way' will be released around February 2009. The "Deluxe Edition" was released on 16 February 2009 in the UK was set for release in the U.S. under Cash Money Records, but the album was canceled for U.S. and Jay Sean began to work on a new album for the American market. The lead single is "Tonight" which was released on 26 January 2009. The album also has 2 additional songs, "Never Been in Love" and "I'm Gone", and 4 additional remixes.

Track listing
 "Ride It" – 3:10
 "Tonight" – 3:42
 "Maybe" – 3:22
 "I Wont Tell" (Remix) (featuring Sway) – 3:38
 "Stay" – 3:40
 "Stuck in the Middle" (featuring Jared Cotter) – 3:38
 "All Or Nothing" – 4:08
 "Never Been in Love" – 3:28
 "Cry" – 4:35
 "Good Enough" – 4:03
 "Used To Love Her" – 3:48
 "Waiting" – 4:06
 "Runaway" – 3:49
 "Just A Friend" – 3:40
 "Murder" – (featuring Thara) 3:58
 "Easy As 1, 2, 3" – 3:21
 "I'm Gone" – 3:16
 "Ride It" (Ishi Hip Hop Remix) – 3:23
 "Maybe" (Panjabi Hit Squad Remix) – 3:14
 "Stay" (Boy Better Know Remix) (featuring Chipmunk, Skepta, Frisco & Jammer) – 3:37
 "Tonight" (FP Radio Edit) – 3:25

Charts

Release history

References

2008 albums
Jay Sean albums